Spragge may refer to:

Locations
Spragge, a town in the township of The North Shore, Ontario, Canada

People
 Edward Spragge (AKA Spragg or Sprague, 162073), Irish admiral in the Royal Navy
 Shirley Spragge (1929 - 1995), Canadian archivist

Ships
 HMS Spragge, more than one ship of the British Royal Navy

See also 
 Spragg (disambiguation)
 Sprague (disambiguation)